Wallis Lake, an open and trained wave dominated barrier estuary, is located within the Mid-Coast Council local government area in the Mid North Coast region of New South Wales, Australia.

Features and location

Hadleys Island lies within Wallis Lake, near the confluence of the Wallamba and Coolongolook rivers.

The waterways surrounding Wallis Lake are well known for oyster production.

Lake Wallis was named in honour of James Wallis, an officer of the 46th Regiment.

See also

 Wallis Island, New South Wales
 List of lakes of Australia

References

External links
 
 
 
 

Lakes of New South Wales
Mid-Coast Council
Mid North Coast